Wadim Zudilin (Вадим Валентинович Зудилин) is a Russian mathematician and number theorist who is active in studying hypergeometric functions and zeta constants. He studied under Yuri V. Nesterenko and worked at Moscow State University, the Steklov Institute of Mathematics, the Max Planck Institute for Mathematics and the University of Newcastle, Australia. He now works at the Radboud University Nijmegen, the Netherlands.

He has reproved Apéry's theorem that ζ(3) is irrational, and expanded it. Zudilin proved that at least one of the four numbers ζ(5), ζ(7), ζ(9), or ζ(11) is irrational. For that accomplishment he won the Distinguished Award of the Hardy-Ramanujan Society in 2001.

With Doron Zeilberger, Zudilin proved an irrationality measure for π, which as of November 2022 is the current best estimate.

References

External links
Wadim Zudilin's homepage
Wadim Zudilin's research profile
Wadim Zudilin's list of published works

Russian mathematicians
Number theorists
Living people
Academic staff of Moscow State University
Academic staff of the University of Newcastle (Australia)
Academic staff of Radboud University Nijmegen
Year of birth missing (living people)